Ed Carpenter Racing is an American racing team based in Speedway, Indiana that currently competes in the IndyCar Series. The team is owned by driver Ed Carpenter.  The team is based in Indianapolis, Indiana, and currently fields the No. 20 Dallara-Chevrolet for Conor Daly for oval races and the No. 21 Dallara-Chevrolet for Rinus VeeKay. In 2015, the team merged with Sarah Fisher Hartman Racing to form CFH Racing, but became ECR again in 2016.

History
After spending five seasons with Vision Racing, and the 2011 IndyCar Series season with Sarah Fisher Hartman Racing, on November 2, 2011, Ed Carpenter announced the creation of Ed Carpenter Racing, which ran its first season in 2012 with sponsorship by Fuzzy's Premium Vodka for three seasons. Among the reasons for the team's creation was concerns surrounding the departure of Sarah Fisher Racing's sponsor Dollar General. IRL founder and Carpenter's stepfather Tony George also became an owner, along with former golfer Fuzzy Zoeller. American Le Mans Series team owner and former Penske Racing member Derrick Walker was hired as general manager; Tim Broyles and Bret Schmitt were hired as team manager and crew chief, respectively.

On February 13, 2012, it was confirmed that the team will run with engines from Chevrolet. Carpenter stated that he was intending to run a full season, unlike in previous seasons, where he ran the ovals, and had also decided to drive with #20, the number he drove with during his tenure at Vision Racing. The team claimed its first victory with Carpenter winning the season-ending MAVTV 500 at Auto Club Speedway, and ECR became the only one-driver team to win a race in 2012. In 2013, Walker left for a position with IndyCar. Eventually, Carpenter scored the pole position for the Indianapolis 500. He finished the season sixteenth in points, with a best result of second at the final race at Auto Club Speedway.

For the 2014 season, Carpenter competed in the oval races on the calendar, while Mike Conway competed for the team on road and street courses. On March 20, J. R. Hildebrand was hired to run the 2014 Indianapolis 500 with the team in the No. 21. The move to a shared drive paid off well for the team early in the year, with Conway winning the 40th Toyota Grand Prix of Long Beach, and Carpenter winning the Indy 500 pole for the second consecutive year. Carpenter's four lap average of 231.067 mph was the first Indy pole-claiming run in excess of 230 mph for 11 years. Unfortunately, he was involved in a crash with James Hinchcliffe on a late restart, finishing 27th. Later in the season, Carpenter won the Firestone 600 at Texas Motor Speedway, his first win since the 2012 triumph at Fontana.

On August 16, 2014, Carpenter announced the team would merge with Sarah Fisher Hartman Racing for the 2015 season, becoming CFH Racing. After one season, Hartman and Fisher left the sport and CFH was rebranded to Ed Carpenter Racing.

On June 2, 2016, the team announced that 2015 Indy Lights champion Spencer Pigot would drive in the No. 20 car in all remaining road and street circuit events. The arrangement was similar to Mike Conway's during the 2014 season. On June 12, 2016, Josef Newgarden sustained a fractured clavicle and wrist in an accident during the Firestone 600. The team announced the following day that J. R. Hildebrand would fill in for Newgarden until he recovered from his injuries. However, Newgarden was able to recover enough from his injuries to not miss any races.

For the 2017 season, Carpenter and Pigot remained with the team with the same agreement as the previous season. However, with the full-time entry vacated by Newgarden's departure to Team Penske, the team hired J. R. Hildebrand as the new full-time driver. During the second race of the season at Long Beach, Hildebrand suffered a broken bone in his left hand. As a result, he was forced to sit out the next race. The team hired Indy Lights driver Zach Veach to fill in for Hildebrand while he recovered from his injuries.

On March 7, 2018, it was announced that Danica Patrick would drive a third car for the team in her final Indianapolis 500 appearance.

Racing results

Complete IndyCar Series results
(key)

* Season still in progress

 In conjunction with Scuderia Corsa

IndyCar wins

 Note: this does not include two wins achieved in 2015 as CFH Racing.

References

External links

 

IndyCar Series teams
American auto racing teams
Auto racing teams established in 2011